New Kyo is a village in County Durham, in England. It is situated close to the A693 road between Annfield Plain and Stanley, and is slightly larger than nearby East Kyo and West Kyo.

Villages in County Durham
Stanley, County Durham